"Thank U" is a song by Canadian-American recording artist and songwriter Alanis Morissette from her fourth studio album, Supposed Former Infatuation Junkie (1998). The song was written by Alanis Morissette and Glen Ballard, who produced her previous album, Jagged Little Pill (1995). Morissette wrote the song after she came back from a trip to India. Maverick and Reprise Records released the song as a single on October 12, 1998.

The song received generally positive reviews from music critics and performed well on the record charts, becoming Morissette's fifth number-one single in Canada, reaching the top three in New Zealand and Norway, and peaking within the top ten in several other countries, including the United Kingdom, where it is her highest-charting single. An accompanying music video was released for the single, featuring Morissette nude in the streets. The song was nominated for Best Female Pop Vocal Performance at the 2000 Grammy Awards.

Background
After the massive success of her breakthrough album Jagged Little Pill (1995) (which spawned the worldwide hits, "You Oughta Know", "Ironic", "Head over Feet", "Hand in My Pocket" and "You Learn"), Morissette was considered one of the biggest music stars in the world, and many fans anxiously awaited a follow-up album. During a trip to India, in 1997, Alanis wrote some songs, including "Thank U". In 1998, Morissette contributed with the song "Uninvited" for the soundtrack of the 1998 film City of Angels.

In September of the same year, "Thank U" was released on radio and Alanis talked with MTV about the break between LPs and the first single: "Basically, I had never stopped in my whole life, hadn't taken a long breath, and I took a year and a half off and basically learned how to do that. When I did stop and I was silent and I breathed... I was just left with an immense amount of gratitude, and inspiration, and love, and bliss, and that's where the song came from, you know."

Composition and writing
"Thank U" was written and produced by Alanis Morissette and Glen Ballard. "Thank U" is a rock song composed in the key of C major. It is written in common time and moves at a moderate tempo of 91 beats per minute. The song uses a simple chord progression alternating between a tonic C major chord, dominant G major chord, and the subdominant F major chord. The music is simple, mid-tempo rock, with the drum track being a loop of the oft-sampled break in Sly and the Family Stone's "Sing a Simple Song". A delicate electric piano intro underscores Morissette's vocals, which begin by asking, "How bout getting off these antibiotics?" The rest of the song continues with Morissette posing similar provocative questions -- "How bout remembering your divinity?"—and her thanking the circumstances—terror, disillusionment, and consequence, among others—that helped her achieve personal growth. 
 
The lyrics document Morissette's spiritual awakenings following her trip to India, as well as other physical and internal journeys. In "Thank U", Alanis expresses the heartfelt gratitude, inspiration, and compassion that she felt at the time she wrote it. According to Jon Pareles of The New York Times, the song has "verses of self-help," such as, "How 'bout no longer being masochistic?, how 'bout remembering your divinity?, how 'bout unabashedly bawling your eyes out?." Liana Jones of Allmusic noticed that "There aren't many artists, let alone everyday people, who acknowledge and pay tribute to life's lessons."

Critical reception
Stephen Thomas Erlewine of AllMusic picked the song as a highlight from the album, writing that "the textured production functions as a backdrop for Morissette's cryptically introspective lyrics." Liana Jones also of Allmusic wrote that the song's lyrics are "a real boon for contemporary rock music, which tends to be simplistic and hackneyed in its themes." Larry Flick of Billboard praised the singer's performance, acknowledging her "zen-like confidence", calling it "an instantly memorable single that will saturate radio airwaves at all possible formats within a split-second." Daily Record noted that Morissette "returns to angst-ridden form". Ken Tucker of Entertainment Weekly wrote that the song's structure "creates an immediate catchiness, underpinned and emphasized by Gary Novak's hypnotic drum pattern." Tucker also called 'Thank U,' "a terrific single, with its positive sentiments tucked inside a crystalline melody like a message in a bottle." NME praised the "pleasant, lilting Liz Cocteau-on-a-broomstick style frame." Rob Sheffield of Rolling Stone wrote that the song "could've been a pretentious disaster, but instead it's a pretentious stroke of brilliance – she finds something shockingly smart to say about her spiritual crises, riding an indelible Eighties AOR synth hook and wailing like Robert Plant stealing 'Kashmir' back from Jimmy Page and 'Puffy'. Sal Cinquemani of Slant Magazine called the "soft-rock synth hook" and "the bundle of Morissette's signature list-y lyrics," "anything but ordinary."

Chart performance
"Thank U" debuted on the US Billboard Hot 100 Airplay chart at number 42. A week later, it debuted on the Modern Rock Tracks at number 19. The same week, the song climbed to number 11 on the Hot 100 Airplay chart, On the issue of November 28, 1998, "Thank U" topped the Adult Top 40 Tracks chart. On the Billboard Hot 100 chart, "Thank U" peaked at number 17, on the issue date December 5, 1998. In Canada, "Thank U" topped the RPM Top Singles chart for three consecutive weeks (six weeks if counting the holiday period in which no charts were published), becoming her fifth number-one single there.

"Thank U" was also successful in the Oceania region. In Australia, it debuted at number 20 and peaked at number 15 on the ARIA Singles Chart, becoming the album's only single that charted there. In New Zealand, the song proved to be more successful, debuting at number six and peaking at number two, becoming Morissette's highest charting-single in New Zealand, until "Hands Clean" peaked at number one in 2002. In Austria, it peaked at number 10, becoming her last top-ten single, while in Norway, "Thank U" was her highest charting-single, peaking at number three. In the United Kingdom, the song was the highest charting-single of Morissette's career, peaking at number five. It is her second highest-selling single there, only behind "Ironic", which reached number 11.

Accolades
"Thank U" was nominated for Best Female Pop Vocal Performance at the 2000 Grammy Awards, but lost to Sarah McLachlan's "I Will Remember You". Morissette was nominated for a Juno Award for Songwriter of the Year (for writing the songs "So Pure", "Thank U" and "Unsent") at the 2000 edition. Additionally, the song entered About.coms "Top 10 Alanis Morissette Lyrics" list at number 3, with Bill Lamb picking the lyrics, "How about me not blaming you for everything/How about me enjoying the moment for once/How about how good it feels to finally forgive you/How about grieving it all one at a time" as the best.

ReDigi website also listed the "Top 10 Alanis Morissette Songs", picking "Thank U" as her third best song, writing that, "Most of the attention might have been focused on its revealing video, but the angst-ridden melancholy of 'Thank You' works just as well without images of Alanis wandering the streets in her birthday suit."

Music video

The music video for the song was directed by French director Stéphane Sednaoui (who previously directed "Ironic" for Morissette) and premiered on October 12, 1998, on MTV's Total Request Live. It features Morissette walking around and being embraced by strangers in a variety of public locations, such as in the street, at a supermarket, and on a subway car. Throughout the video, Morissette is completely nude with her long hair shrouding her breasts and her pubic region blurred out. Slight modifications to the video were made before broadcasting by MTV in India and certain other Asian countries. Subsequent replays, however, aired the video in its original format. In May 2001, the video was voted number 66 on VH1's 100 Greatest Videos.

While being asked why she chose to be nude in the video, Morissette said, "Actually, the idea for that video hit me in my shower - I was thinking about the song and its simplicity and its baring itself, and I just thought, 'Wouldn't it be great if I could just walk around New York City or grocery stores in just a symbolism of being naked everywhere I went?'. Less about overt sexuality and more about the symbolism of being really raw and naked and intimate in all these environments where you'd seemingly need protection, like in a subway and those kinds of places. So that hit me in the shower and then we executed it." It was filmed in Downtown Los Angeles, under a closed set.

Track listingCanadian maxi-single and international CD single "Thank U" (album version) – 4:18
 "Pollyanna Flower" – 4:05
 "Uninvited" (demo) – 3:02UK 7-inch jukebox single'''
A. "Thank U" (album version)
B. "Uninvited" (demo)

Charts

Weekly charts

Year-end charts

Decade-end charts

Certifications

Release history

Cover versions and parodies
 "Thank U" was covered by English progressive rock musician Steven Wilson (who jokingly changed the line "How about them transparent dangling carrots" to "How about changing a line 'cause it don't make sense"). Blackfield, one of Wilson's bands, has regularly played the song on tour.
 On an episode of Saturday Night Live, Jimmy Fallon appeared on the "Weekend Update" segment in which he sang various parody songs about Halloween. One such song was a parody of "Thank U", in which he thanks all of the candy that he had received Trick-or-Treating.
 On MadTV, there was a parody, "Wash Me", starring Mo Collins which takes place in a laundromat.
 On French & Saunders, Jennifer Saunders parodied Morissette with a song called "Bless U", a tribute to thesauri, dictionaries, spell check and other word referencing methods. The clip showed Saunders as a singer called Aimless Morris Minor, dressed in a flesh-coloured body-suit to make it appear as if she were naked. At the end of the sketch, Dawn French stuck the pubic hair of the suit onto Saunders's face. This clip was shown as a sketch on French and Saunders 1999 Bank Holiday Special.
 "Weird Al" Yankovic debuted an unreleased spoof of "Thank U" titled "Fast Food" on his 1999 Running with Scissors'' tour.
 Tori Amos covered the song on several occasions during the her concert tours, most notably in 2014, during her Unrepentant Geraldines Tour.

References

1990s ballads
1998 singles
1998 songs
Alanis Morissette songs
Maverick Records singles
Music videos directed by Stéphane Sednaoui
Pop ballads
Reprise Records singles
Rock ballads
RPM Top Singles number-one singles
Song recordings produced by Glen Ballard
Songs about India
Songs written by Alanis Morissette
Songs written by Glen Ballard
Trip hop songs